Bellamy Creek Correctional Facility (IBC) is a prison in Ionia for men, run by the Michigan Department of Corrections.

Facility
The prison was opened in December 2001 and is a multi-level facility used for Michigan Department of Corrections male prisoners 18 years of age and older. On-site facilities provide for food service, health care, facility maintenance, storage, and prison administration.

The facility is surrounded by two fences with razor-ribbon wire, and gun towers. Armed staff are also utilized to maintain perimeter security.

Services
The facility offers a library, recreational activities, education programs, substance-abuse treatment, religious services, group psychotherapy, psychiatry, gardening, and therapy. Onsite medical care is supplemented by local medical facilities. The prison is an In-Reach Facility for the Michigan Prisoner Re-Entry Effort (MPRI). There is vocational training available in custodial maintenance technology and horticulture.

See also

 List of Michigan state prisons

References

External links
 
 Michigan Department of Corrections

2001 establishments in Michigan
Buildings and structures in Ionia County, Michigan
Prisons in Michigan